Sir George Browne, 4th Baronet (1680s – 8 May 1737) was an Irish  politician.

He sat in the House of Commons of Ireland from 1713 to 1714, as a Member of Parliament for 
Castlebar.

References 
 

1680s births
Year of birth uncertain
1737 deaths
Baronets in the Baronetage of Nova Scotia
George
Irish MPs 1713–1714
Members of the Parliament of Ireland (pre-1801) for County Mayo constituencies